The Family Court (Ireland) is a division of the District, Circuit and High Courts that deals with family law matters in Ireland. In principle all hearings are in camera and reporting is anonymous, restricted and issued quarterly by a single journalist. 
The court has been the subject of criticisms which have led to its procedures being included in the Third Programme for Law Reform, as well as the attempted implementation of new procedures.

Jurisdiction
The following matters are covered by the Family Court:
 Judicial Separation including maintenance and custody
 Divorce
 Nullity
 Relief following a foreign divorce or separation outside the jurisdiction
 Declaration of Marital Status
 Determination of property disputes
 Remedies against the estate of a deceased spouse
 Declarations of parentage
 Barring Orders and Injunctions

References

External links
 Courts Service
 Law Reform

Family law
Courts of the Republic of Ireland
Ireland